Sheriff v. Gillie, 578 U.S. ___ (2016), was a United States Supreme Court case in which the Court held that the use of the Ohio Attorney General's letterhead, as its direction, was permissible and not a false, deceptive, or misleading representation under the Fair Debt Collection Practices Act.

Background
The Ohio Attorney General contracted out debt collection to private attorneys and instructed them to use the Ohio Attorney General's letterhead.

Opinion of the Court
Associate Justice Ruth Bader Ginsburg authored a unanimous decision.

References

External links
 
 Nations Finance Debt Collection
 SCOTUS Blog Coverage

United States Supreme Court cases
United States Supreme Court cases of the Roberts Court
2016 in United States case law
Debt collection
Ohio Attorneys General